"Again and Again" is a single released by the British rock band Status Quo in 1978. The song was written by Rick Parfitt, Andy Bown and Jackie Lynton and was issued to coincide with the band's headline appearance at the Reading Festival on 26 August 1978.

The song was reprised in 2014 for the band's thirty-first studio album Aquostic (Stripped Bare). It was featured in the ninety-minute launch performance of the album at London's Roundhouse on 22 October, a concert which was recorded and broadcast live by BBC Radio 2 as part of their In Concert series.

Track listing 
 "Again and Again" (Parfitt/Bown/Lynton) (3.40)
 "Too Far Gone" (Lancaster) (3.12)

Charts

References 

Status Quo (band) songs
1978 singles
Songs written by Rick Parfitt
Songs written by Andy Bown
1978 songs
Vertigo Records singles
Song recordings produced by Pip Williams